The pygmy tarsier (Tarsius pumilus), also known as the mountain tarsier or the lesser spectral tarsier, is a nocturnal primate found in central Sulawesi, Indonesia, in an area with lower vegetative species diversity than the lowland tropical forests. The pygmy tarsier was believed to have become extinct in the early 20th century. Then, in 2000, Indonesian scientists accidentally killed one while trapping rats. The first pygmy tarsiers seen alive since the 1920s were found by a research team led by Dr. Sharon Gursky and Ph.D. student Nanda Grow from Texas A&M University on Mount Rore Katimbo in Lore Lindu National Park in August 2008. The two males and single female (a fourth escaped) were captured using nets, and were radio collared to track their movements. As the first live pygmy tarsiers seen in 80-plus years, these captures dispelled the belief among some primatologists that the species was extinct.

Description
Likewise, its ears are also smaller than those of the rest of genus Tarsius. Its fur is tan or buff with predominant grey or brownish red coloring. The pygmy tarsier has nails on all five digits of each hand and on two digits of each foot. The claw-like nails aid in its grasping strength and are also used as an aid in its need for vertical support for feeding and movement. Pygmy tarsiers exhibit low sexual dimorphism, so both sexes are similar in size and appearance.

Unlike other nocturnal species, tarsiers lack a tapetum lucidum due to the diurnal evolutionary history of primates. To make up for this, tarsiers have evolved their large eyes to maximize available light. Tarsiers eyes cannot move in their sockets, but their necks have the ability to turn their heads almost 360 degrees.

Habitat 
The canopy of the mountain forests are low in height and undergrowth is much denser than the lowland forests. The plant diversity is low and covered in thick mosses, resulting in decreased habitat productivity. Pygmy Tarsiers handle this challenging habitat by living at the edge of forests where prey is more abundant.

Diet 
Pygmy tarsiers are insectivorous, feeding primarily on arthropods.  Due to their arboreal lifestyle, their diet consists of airborne insects found in the forest canopy such as moths, grasshoppers, and katydids.

Behavior and ecology
The pygmy tarsier is found in stable bonded pairs, remaining together for up to 15 months. This stable pair bond is usually monogamous. The species has two breeding seasons, one at the beginning of the rainy season and the other at the end, separated by about 6 months. Gestation lasts 178 days on average, and births occur in May and from November to December. Infants are quite precocial, and develop quickly, similar to other juveniles in the genus. The offspring begin capturing their own prey around 42 days of age, and travel in groups after only 23 days. Young females remain with parents until adulthood, while young males leave the natal group as juveniles.

The pygmy tarsier is nocturnal or crepuscular, and is mainly arboreal. It spends most of the daylight hours sleeping on vertical branches in the canopy. T. pumilus is not a nest builder. Unlike other tarsier species, it does not use scent glands to mark territorial boundaries. Also tactile communication and interaction is important with the pygmy tarsier, as in other tarsier species.

Some species of tarsier have recently been found to communicate at ultrasonic frequencies of around 70 kHz on the islands of Bohol and Leyte. The ultrasonic range of their communication is well beyond what may be detected by the human ear and is a distinct advantage to keeping their communication species-specific.

References

Further reading

External links
 Photos of living 'gremlin' discovered in Indonesia

pygmy tarsier
Endemic fauna of Indonesia
Mammals of Sulawesi
Primates of Indonesia
pygmy tarsier
Taxa named by Ned Hollister
Taxa named by Gerrit Smith Miller Jr.